Svobodny Trud is a rural locality (a selo) in Novogeorgiyevsky Selsoviet of Shimanovsky District, Amur Oblast, Russia. The population was 32 as of 2018. There are 5 streets.

Geography 
Svobodny Trud is located 33 km west of Shimanovsk (the district's administrative centre) by road. Novogeorgiyevka is the nearest rural locality.

References 

Rural localities in Shimanovsky District